Lockup Death is a 1994 Indian Kannada-language action film directed and written by Om Prakash Rao starring Devaraj, Nirosha and Saikumar. The film was produced by Ramu for his Ramu Enterprises production banner.

It was the first Kannada film to be made with a budget of ₹1 crore and was the most expensive Kannada film at the time of its release. The film was critically acclaimed upon release and won laurels at the Karnataka State Film Awards. It was also a major commercial success heightening the popularity of Devaraj in action hero roles. Editor R. Janardhan was awarded with Best Editing and Thriller Manju was awarded for his action stunts.

The film was widely famous for its action scenes and became a trendsetter for action films in Sandalwood. The film was dubbed in Telugu with the same name.

Plot 
When a group of young graduates stand anxiously in a que for attending an important job interview, a young man elaborates about how money is necessary to get a job and asks them to go away only to be beaten by them.

The story cuts to Kumar who aspires to be a police officer. His mother, Janaki, mortgages her house, the only property they have, so as to bribe Minister Mahadevayya who have offered him a job. Kumar has a circle of friends who are thick as thieves. Of them only Amar is employed as he unwilling to bribe anyone has opened a workshop for vehicles. The other three - TK, Giri and Soori are unemployed graduates who spends time attending interviews and partying in Amar's money. Amar's cousin Aasha has a deep crush on him and supports him at difficult times. One night Kumar travels to the minister's house only for the latter to renege upon his word causing an incensed Kumar to assault him. He is arrested by the minister's close aid Circle Inspector Rajasekhar. Inspector uses third degree torture to make a reluctant Kumar sign some papers leading to his death. With the help of Marimuthu, a local rowdy, they bury his corpse. However, Amar, who has already been into a fight with Marimuthu gets to know about this from the latter and takes him to Superindent of Police Lakshman. The next day in the court Advocate Kabinipathi who defends the minister and the Inspector accuses Amar of the murder with the fake evidences planted by the corrupt Superindent supporting the claim. He is given a life imprisonment. It is revealed that Marimuthu was killed so as to hide the truth. Unable to face the humiliation and ostracism, Amar's mother and sister commit suicide. While he is taken to perform their last rites, he kills Lakshman and in return is brutally tortured in the prison by Rajasekhar. The next day when he is taken to the hospital his friends rescue him. However, Giri gets killed in the process.

Amar is taken to a secret hideout where he after initial opposition agrees to make his friends and Asha part of his vengeance crusade. Taking the alias of Janma who has achieved Punarjanma (Reincarnation) he threatens to kill his rivals. He first kills Lawyer Kabinipathi and hangs him before court. The pressure of the case mounts upon Commissioner Venkataramayya who gives an ultimatum for Rajasekhar. An enraged Rajasekhar goes with a battalion to Amar's old housing colony in Shantipura and thrashes the innocent people. Amar's uncle criticises them for not believing in Amar and then leads them in a violent rebellion against the police officers. They barge into the station and beat the officers until stopped by Venkataramayya who after coming to know about what happened in the colony feels humiliated and suspends Rajasekhar. He also understands Amar's innocence and declares how he doubt the involvement of the minister in Kumar's custodial death forcing the latter to resign from his post.

Meanwhile, Rajasekhar along with a few hooligans raid Amar's safe house and captures his friends. Amar after a long fight rescues them and impales Rajasekhar to his death. Venkataramayya beefs up the security outside Mahadevayya's house. However, Soori manages to lure them away by posing as a sniper while Amar defeats the ex-minister's bodyguards. Before he can kill Mahadevayya he is captured by the police.

The story shifts to the Uccha Nyayalaya where the prosecutor advocates for capital punishment to battle criminals like Amar when he bursts out about how he became Janma with the law having equal role in it. He mentions about how the blindfolded justice cannot understand the unseen anecdotes behind crimes. Even Venkataramayya threatens to quit his job if the court doesn't serve Amar justice after placing his gun and belt on the Judge's bench. Just about when the Judge is about to read his verdict (possibly negative as poetic justice is not practical) the young man from the beginning of the film who was also a victim of the minister's deceit takes the gun from Judge's bench and murders the ex-minister with all others standing in incredulity.

Cast 
 Devaraj as Amar (Janma) 
 Nirosha as Asha 
 Saikumar as Kumar 
 Prakash Raj as Giri 
 Shobhraj as Soori 
 Tennis Krishna as Tennis Krishna (TK)
 Costume Krishna as Minister Mahadevayya
 Pradeep Shakthi as Circle inspector Rajashekhar 
 Vajramuni as Police Commissioner Venkataramayya
 Doddanna as Lawyer Kabinipathi 
 Lokesh as Amar's uncle
  Jayachitra as Amar's mother
  Dubbing Janaki  as Kumar's mother
 Avinash as Inspector
 Honnavalli Krishna as Lady Auto Driver
 Dingri Nagaraj as Jaagate 
 Lakshman Rao as Police Superintendent Lakshman 
 Lohithaswa as Highcourt Judge 
 Rambo Rocky as Maarimutthu 
Silk Smitha cameo appearance in song "Current Banthu"
Raju Sundaram cameo appearance in song "Current Banthu"

Production 
The chase scenes required the stuntmen in the costumes of police chasing the protagonist who is being saved by his friends (Shobharaj driving the ambulance with Nirosha and Tennis Krishna inside the Tempo Traveller van with Devaraj in unconscious state). The stuntmen Shivakumar and Ravi had to jump upon a double decker bus of the Bangalore Metropolitan Transport Corporation (then BTS) but something went wrong which resulted in serious injuries of the crew. This stunt was shot in M G Road, Bangalore near Barton court. Around 70 motorcycles and 30 jeeps were involved in the action scenes. Most of the motorcycles used were Yezdi Roadking and Oil King motorcycles.

Soundtrack 
The music of the film was composed and lyrics written by Hamsalekha.

References

External source 

 Lockup Death Songs

1994 films
1990s Kannada-language films
Indian action films
1990s masala films
Films scored by Hamsalekha
Films directed by Om Prakash Rao
Fictional portrayals of the Karnataka Police
1994 action films